Minamoto no Kintada (889–948, Japanese: 源 公忠, also 源公忠朝臣 Miyamoto no Kintada Ason) was a middle Heian waka poet and nobleman. Along with his son Minamoto no Saneakira he is designated a member of the Thirty-six Poetry Immortals. Under Emperor Daigo and Emperor Suzaku he was an official in the imperial treasury.

Kintada's poems are included in imperial poetry anthologies from the Goshūi Wakashū onward. A personal collection known as the Kintadashū also remains. The Great Mirror and Yamato Monogatari preserve anecdotes about him, and he excelled in falconry and kōdō, in addition to poetry.

External links
E-text of his poems in Japanese

889 births
948 deaths
Minamoto clan
10th-century Japanese poets